The Woman of My Dreams is a 1944 German  musical comedy film directed by Georg Jacoby and starring Marika Rökk, Wolfgang Lukschy and Walter Müller.

The film's sets were designed by the art director Erich Kettelhut. It was shot at the Babelsberg and Tempelhof Studios in Berlin, using the Agfacolor process. It premiered at the Marmorhaus in August 1944.

Cast
Marika Rökk as Revuestar Julia Köster
Wolfgang Lukschy as Senior Engineer Peter Groll
Walter Müller as Ingenieur Erwin Forster
Georg Alexander as Theaterdirektor
Grethe Weiser as Jungfer Luise
Inge Drexel as Dorfmädchen Resi
Valentin Froman as Julia's dance partner
Willy Schulte-Vogelheim as Julia's dance partner
Egon Vogel as Reporter
Erna Krüger as place up keeper in the Revuetheater
Karin Lüsebrink as cashier des Revuetheaters
Lotte Spira as canteen landlady
Vera Witt as Julias Gardrobiere Mariechen
Erwin Fichtner as Logengast mit Monokel
Julius Brandt as sleeping passenger in the car compartment
Karl Etlinger as Head waiter in the station restaurant
Karl Hannemann as coat handler at the station
Victor Janson as frequent customer
Fritz Lafontaine as Theatre stage manager
Gustav Püttjer as Sprengmeister bei Groll
Connie Hansen as Platzanweiserin
Hans Stiebner as train passenger
Jakob Tiedtke as old man at the box office
Herbert Weißbach as Schlafwagenkontrolleur
Ewald Wenck as Bühnenportier

References

External links

1944 musical comedy films
German musical comedy films
Films of Nazi Germany
Films directed by Georg Jacoby
UFA GmbH films
Films shot at Tempelhof Studios
Films shot at Babelsberg Studios
German black-and-white films
1940s German-language films
1940s German films